Yun Jong-rin (born 1938) is a general of the Korean People's Army Ground Force. He is serving as the commander of North Korea's Supreme Guard Command since 2010.

The force is responsible for the personal protection of the ruling Kim family. He is also a member of the Workers' Party of Korea and its Central Military Commission.

References

Living people
1938 births
North Korean politicians
North Korean generals
Law enforcement in North Korea
Date of birth missing (living people)